Industriales is a Cuban football team playing at the top level. It is based in Havana.  Their home stadium is Campo Armada.

Players

Achievements
Campeonato Nacional de Fútbol de Cuba: 4
 1963, 1964, 1972, 1973

References

Football clubs in Cuba
Sport in Havana